Ouest (French for west) may refer to:

Ouest (department), Haiti
Ouest Department (Ivory Coast), defunct administrative subdivision of Ivory Coast
Ouest Province, Cameroon
Ouest Province, Rwanda
Ouest-France, a French newspaper
West France (European Parliament constituency)

See also 

 West (disambiguation)
 
 

zh:西